Gabriel Antony Rogers (born 19 May 1990) is an American professional basketball player, who currently plays for the CB Peixefresco of the Spanish Basketball League LEB Gold.

Playing career
Rogers played for Northern Arizona University where he went on to lead the Big Sky Conference in scoring his senior year. He was drafted in the NBA D-League in 2012. Rogers started to play professionally overseas in 2014 with Marín Peixefresco in the Spanish LEB Plata. He promoted with the Galician team to LEB Oro in March 2016, finishing the league as the top scorer of the season and as a member of the All-LEB Plata Team.

Honors

With Peixefresco
LEB Plata: (1)
2016
Copa LEB Plata: (1)
2016

References

External links
ESPN Profile
Eurobasket.com Profile
Spanish Basketball Federation profile

1990 births
Living people
American men's basketball players
Basketball players from Houston
Northern Arizona Lumberjacks men's basketball players
Capitanes de Ciudad de México players
Point guards
Shooting guards